Charlie Kerr (11 August 1890 Philadelphia – 7 October 1976 Coconut Grove, Miami, Florida) was an American jazz drummer who led a jazz orchestra bearing his name in Philadelphia beginning in the early 1920s.  In 1922, Kerr led orchestra in the first radio remote broadcast of a dance in history from the Café L'Aiglon, Philadelphia, via WIP radio.  Throughout the 1930s, his orchestra continued broadcasting on stations WFI and WLIT, which merged as WFIL in 1935.  During the summers of the 1930, through World War II years, his orchestra performed in Cape May City, New Jersey.

Kerr retired from music in the late 1940s and opened his own furniture store in Miami.

Members of the Charlie Kerr Orchestra 
 Frank Guarantee (1893–1942) – trumpet
 Cecil Way – trumpet
 Joseph DeLuca – trombone
 Tommy Dorsey (1905–1956) – trombone
 Leo McConville (1900–1968) – trumpet
 Vincenzo D'Imperio (born 1885) – saxophone
 Jerry DeMasi (born 1901) – saxophone
 Stan Keller (1907–1990) – saxophone
 William A. Bove (born 1901) – piano
 Robert McCracken – piano
 Michael O. Trafficante (born 1892) – double bass
 Albert Valante – violin
 Joe Venuti (1903 –1978) – violin
 Eddie Lang (1902–1933) – banjo, guitar

Employers as a musician 
 The Bellevue-Stratford Hotel, Philadelphia ( 1918)

Family 
In 1918, Charlie married Edna VanDusen Kerr (née Hilt; 1894–1980).  They had two children, Harry Nagle Kerr, D.O. (1912–1998) and Edward Allison Kerr (1924–2010).

Charlie’s parents, Henry Nagle Kerr (1867–1951 Miami) and Mary Emma Kerr (née Thomas; 1867–1943 Philadelphia) were married in 1889.

References

1890 births
1976 deaths
American jazz drummers
20th-century American drummers
American male drummers
20th-century American male musicians
American male jazz musicians